The first season of The Real Housewives of Atlanta, an American reality television series, was broadcast on Bravo. It aired from October 7, 2008, until November 25, 2008, and was primarily filmed in Atlanta, Georgia. Its executive producers are Lauren Eskelin, Lorraine Haughton, Glenda Hersh, Carlos King, and Steven Weinstock.

The Real Housewives of Atlanta focuses on the lives of NeNe Leakes, DeShawn Snow, Shereé Whitfield, Lisa Wu-Hartwell, and Kim Zolciak. During the season, Leakes frequently clashes with Whitfield and Zolciak, while several of the housewives pursue business careers. It consisted of eight episodes, all of which aired on Tuesday evenings; two were aired at 9:00 pm, while six were broadcast at 10:00 pm.

This season marked the final regular appearance of DeShawn Snow.

Production and crew
The Real Housewives of Atlanta was announced as the third installment in The Real Housewives franchise, intending to capitalize on the successes of its predecessors The Real Housewives of Orange County and The Real Housewives of New York City. Its television network Bravo stated that the series' planned storyline focused on "[balancing] motherhood, demanding careers and a fast-paced social calendar". The season premiere "Welcome One, Welcome ATL" was aired on October 7, 2008, while the seventh episode "Best of Enemies" served as the season finale, and was aired on November 18, 2008. It was followed by a one-part reunion special, which marked the conclusion of the season and was broadcast on November 25, 2008. Lauren Eskelin, Lorraine Haughton, Glenda Hersh, Carlos King, and Steven Weinstock are recognized as the series' executive producers; it is produced and distributed by True Entertainment, an American subsidiary of the Italian corporation Endemol.

Cast and synopsis
Five housewives were featured during the first season of The Real Housewives of Atlanta, which Bravo described as "entrepreneurs, doting mothers, and classy Southern women." NeNe Leakes and her husband Gregg live in Sugarloaf with their two sons; she founded The Twisted Hearts Foundation in an effort to reduce domestic violence and expresses an interest in opening an upscale hotel. DeShawn Snow recently moved to Alpharetta with her husband Eric Snow and their three sons, and is heavily involved in charitable donations and organizations. Single mother Shereé Whitfield and her three children live in Sandy Springs; she was in the process of launching her fashion collection "She by Shereé". Lisa Wu-Hartwell, her husband Ed Hartwell, and their three children live in an upscale country club community in Duluth; she operates a real estate firm, a jewelry line, and a clothing collection. Single mother Kim Zolciak and her two daughters also live in Duluth; she is in the process of recording a country music album.

Reception

U.S. television ratings
The premiere episode "Welcome One, Welcome ATL" attracted 656,000 viewers in its initial broadcast on October 7, 2008; in doing so, it became the least-watched episode of the season and in the history of the series. The second episode "It's My Party!" was broadcast to 1.18 million viewers on October 14, 2008, from which point the season maintained a steady viewership exceeding one million individuals through the remainder of its run. The season finale "Best of Enemies" attracted 2.21 viewers in its initial broadcast on November 18, 2008, while the reunion special aired the following week earned the season its peak viewership with an audience of 2.82 million.

Episodes

References

External links

2008 American television seasons
Atlanta (season 1)